You Are a Gift is a 2016 South Korean evening daily drama series starring Heo Yi-jae, Cha Do-jin, Choi Myung-gil, Jin Ye-sol, Kim Cheong, Song Jae-hee, and Shim Ji-ho. It aired on SBS from June 13 to November 24, 2016, airing every Monday to Friday evening at 19:20 for 111 episodes.

Cast and characters

Main cast
Heo Yi-jae as Kong Hyeon-soo
Park Ji-so as young Kong Hyeon-soo
Cha Do-jin as Ma Doo-jin
Choi Myung-gil as Eun Young-ae
Jin Ye-sol as Kang Se-ra
Kim Cheong as Cheon Tae-hwa
Song Jae-hee as Ma Seong-jin
Shim Ji-ho as Han Yoon-ho

People around Kong Hyeon-soo
Sa Mi-ja as Choi Kang-ja 
Yoon Yoo-sun as Bok Soon-yi 
Im Ji-eun as Kong Eul-sook 
Jo Yi-hyun as Kong Han-sol

People around Ma Doo-jin
Im Chae-moo as Ma Dong-sik 
Yoon Soo as Ma Yeo-jin

People around Kang Se-ra
Bang Eun-hee as Yoo Mi-ran 
Lee Byung-joon as Kang Poong-ho

People around Han Yoon-ho
Ahn Nae-sang as Professor Han

Extended cast
Na Ya as Song Hyo-rim
Kim Byung-se as Kim Chul-yong
Kim Young-jae as Kong Gil-dong
Kim Young-ok
Seo Jin-wook
Choi Dae-hoon as Detective Hwang
Jung Hyun-seok 
Go Myung-hwan as Mr. Lee
Way as Kyungha (the gossiping office worker In Kang Se-ra's team)
Lee Kyu-seob
Hong Seo-joon as Kim Seo-joon
Lee Jeong-seong
Uhm Seo-hyun

References

External links
  
 

Seoul Broadcasting System television dramas
Korean-language television shows
2016 South Korean television series debuts
2016 South Korean television series endings
South Korean romance television series
South Korean melodrama television series
Television series by Celltrion Entertainment